Omid Hussein Bertil Mohammadian Khansari (born 23 August 1979 in Tampa, Florida) is a Swedish actor. He studied at NAMA in Malmö 1998–2002.

Selected filmography
Kommissarie Späck (2010)
 2009 – Babben & Co
 2008 – Oskyldigt dömd
 2008 – Vampyrer
Beck – Den svaga länken (2007)
 2007 – Babben & Co
Futurevision (2006)
 2006 – Möbelhandlarens dotter
Paketet (2006)
 2004 – Raggadish
 2003 – De drabbade
 2003 – Belinder auktioner

References

External links

Omid Khansari's website

1979 births
Swedish male actors
Living people